Pittsford Township is one of sixteen townships in Butler County, Iowa, USA.  As of the 2020 census, its population was 859.

Geography
According to the USGS, it contains six cemeteries: Dumont, Harlan, Needham, Oak Hill, Old Bristow and South Bristow.

References

External links
 US-Counties.com
 City-Data.com

Townships in Butler County, Iowa
Townships in Iowa